Soheil Mosun Limited (SML) is a custom architectural manufacturer and design-build company headquartered in Toronto, Ontario, Canada.
Founded in 1973 by Soheil and Brigitta Mosun, SML was established as a privately owned corporation. SML started as an architectural model-building firm and has since progressed to a complete design-build company capable of servicing any fabrication or architectural manufacturing project.

History
The company was founded by husband & wife, Soheil and Brigitta Mosun in 1973.

Notable projects

 The brass clock in Oakville Place.
 Library of Parliament in Ottawa, Ontario, Canada – bronze windows fabrication and restoration.
 Elevator cab interior design and fabrication in 1st Canadian Place, Scotia Plaza, BCE Place and the CN Tower
 The construction of the Baha’i Temple in Santiago Chile.
 The construction of the International Jewish War Veterans Memorial in Toronto, Ontario, Canada
 Repairs to ‘’Wheel of Conscience’’ at the Canadian Museum of Immigration at Pier 21

Other projects

SML is involved in the manufacturing of many awards for various prestigious institutions such as:
The Genie Award
The Gemini Award
The Scotiabank Giller Prize
The Advertising Design Industry of Canada award
The Canadian Country Music Award
The Canadian Walk of Fame Stars

References

Manufacturing companies based in Toronto

Companies based in Etobicoke